Springville (also Centerville) is an unincorporated community in Livingston Parish, Louisiana, United States.

Notes

Unincorporated communities in Livingston Parish, Louisiana
Unincorporated communities in Louisiana